Goldmania is a genus in the family of Hummingbirds, and consists of 2 species.

Species
The two species are:
Violet-capped hummingbird, Goldmania violiceps
Pirre hummingbird, Goldmania bella

The Pirre hummingbird was formerly placed in the monospecific genus Goethalsia. A molecular phylogenetic study published in 2014 found that the Pirre hummingbird was closely related to the violet-capped hummingbird in the genus Goldmania. The two species were therefore placed together in Goldmania which has priority.

References

Goldmania
Bird genera